The Dancing England Rapper Tournament (DERT) is a continuation of the most significant rapper sword dance competitions that were held in Newcastle upon Tyne, England, the centre of the coalfields where the dance originated. The modern annual weekend event, held at different venues in the UK, brings together rapper teams and sword dancers from around the country and occasionally abroad.

While the element of competition is important, the social aspects are just as fierce. The essential idea behind the tournament was then and is now that teams have to practise well and develop their skills.

Background

The Newcastle Tournament of Music and Art, which included a Traditional Short Sword or Rapper competition for seniors and juniors, was held annually in the City Hall and other prestigious venues around the city. This event was known later as the North of England Musical Tournament which began in 1919. One of its founders was the Newcastle composer and violinist Alfred M Wall. The event continued under that name until the early 1950s.

The event consisted of many musical and performance classes held over most of a week, but it was the Saturday Rapper competition that drew the most crowds. Judges were imported from the newly formed, London-based, English Folk Dance Society, founded and directed by folk song and dance collector Cecil Sharp.

The pit villages where the dance was "invented" were known for their tight knit communities and fierce independence, and they sent their best teams along. The City Hall was packed and the press were ready to lionise the winners. First the Juniors, then a few women's and girls' teams and then finally the men competed for the Cowen Trophy, medals and glory.

In the early days, papers such as the Evening Chronicle and the Northern Echo had banner headlines of the results, giving fame and pride to the village of the trophy winners. Whichever team won was copied. Stepping patterns, new tunes, and figures and movements were stolen or borrowed. Rivalry was high with reported fights backstage and around town.

The modern DERT competition

The modern DERT competition has its origins in an event which took place during the Dancing England event of traditional English dancing which was held in the Assembly Rooms in Derby between 1979 and 1987.  A rapper competition known as the Dancing England Rapper Tournament (DERT) took place on the afternoon prior to the evening performance.

Following the demise of Dancing England, the rapper sword competition continued under the name "DERT".

The competition travels around the country and is organised by a different rapper team every year with support provided by previous DERT organisers, the wider rapper community and the Sword Dance Union. In most years it is an international competition, with past entries from teams from the UK, United States, China, Denmark, Canada and Norway. Between 25 and 30 teams compete for prizes, accolades and bragging rights for the following year. Entries are divided into three divisions: Premier, Championship and Open, with potential promotions and demotions occurring depending on how the teams dance. Musicians compete for the Angela Lee Trophy. The Tommy and Betty characters employed by most of the sword dance teams are also subject to the judges' scrutiny.

The competition takes place in pubs in the host city, with teams dancing in front of two judges. The judges are tasked with grading the teams on their sword handling skills, teamwork, stepping and creation of 'buzz factor'. There is also a Spotlight dance in front of four judges in a quieter environment where accuracy and teamwork become very important. There is a Traditional competition, where teams must perform a traditional dance as notated in three defined publications. Veteran dancers are encouraged to compete for the Adrienne Moss Trophy, a carved wooden sculpture of walking sticks.

The future of DERT and rapper sword dancing is also catered for, with a competition called DERTy. This section is divided into Youth and Junior sections with dancers practising and then performing in front of a judging panel.

DERT finishes with a showcase event where all teams dance on stage in front of each other, and the various prizes and awards are given. The overall winner of DERT receives the Steve Marris Trophy, which recognises the massive contribution made by Marris to the rapper sword community. For many years he was the UK's only manufacturer of rapper swords; without him, rapper sword dancing as a traditional dance form would have been in very serious danger of dying out. Currently there are two rapper and longsword manufacturers keeping the tradition alive, Jimmie Killner in Hampshire and Frank Lee in Brampton, Cumbria.

Other rapper competitions

The North East Rapper Championship was devised by folklorist Peter Kennedy when he worked for the EFDSS in Newcastle. It was meant to revive the flagging competitions of the dying Newcastle Tournament. It had its first event in Hexham in 1949, where Royal Earsdon were the winners. Over the next few years it was held in various places in the North East. Royal Earsdon were invariably the winners until the competition ceased in 1956.

This competition has also had a revival, and in 2011, the Newcastle Kingsmen won a new Trophy in Washington, Co. Durham. Other winners have been High Spen, Sallyport, and Star and Shadow. Venues have been Hexham, and the Sage and St Mary's in Gateshead. In January 2018, the NE Championship with an extra Traditional class was held in the Cumberland Arms, Byker, in Newcastle.

Winners

The most recent DERT competitions took place in Rochdale in 2023, and Derby in 2022. The 2021 event was to have been in Edinburgh, hosted by Mons Meg, but was cancelled due to the Coronavirus pandemic. The 2020 event  in Lincoln (Whip the Cat) was cancelled for the same reason.

Details of the locations and dates of recent DERT competitions are given below.

References

Rapper sword
Annual events in England